Churubusco could be referring to:

Churubusco, a neighbourhood in the Federal District, Mexico
Battle of Churubusco, fought there on 20 August 1847
Estudios Churubusco, motion picture studios located in the Churubusco district
Río Churubusco, a river that formerly ran through the area
Churubusco, Indiana, United States, a town named after the above battle
Churubusco, New York, United States, an unincorporated town named in honor of the U.S. troops from New York who fought in the above battle
Huitzilopochco, a pre-Columbian polity also called Churubusco